Charles Greenlee may refer to:

Charles Greenlee, one of the Groveland Four
Charles Greenlee (musician) (1927–1993), American jazz trombonist